Petra Chaves (born 2 February 1978) is a Portuguese backstroke and medley swimmer. She competed in two events at the 1996 Summer Olympics.

References

External links
 

1978 births
Living people
Portuguese female backstroke swimmers
Portuguese female medley swimmers
Olympic swimmers of Portugal
Swimmers at the 1996 Summer Olympics
Place of birth missing (living people)